The 1906–07 Lancashire Cup was the second year that the competition was conducted and saw two clubs fight it out for the right to hold the trophy. This year, the cup was won by Broughton Rangers who beat Warrington at Central Park, Wigan, (historically in the county of Lancashire),  by a score of 15-6. The attendance for the final was 14,048 and receipts £392.

Background 
For this season’s competition, Morecambe had left the league and no junior/amateur club were included, but in their place were new league entrants, Wigan Highfield. This resulted in there being 13 teams in the competition (one less than the preceding year) which resulted in three clubs awarded byes in the first round.

Fixtures and results

Round 1 
Involved 5 matches (with three byes) and 16 Clubs

Round 2 - Quarterfinals

Round 3 – semifinals

Final

Teams and scorers 
 

Scoring - Try = three (3) points - Goal = two (2) points - Drop goal = two (2) points

The road to success

See also 
British rugby league system
1906–07 Northern Rugby Football Union season
Rugby league county cups

Notes 

1 * Central Park was the home ground of Wigan with a final capacity of 18,000, although the record attendance was 47,747 for Wigan v St Helens 27 March 1959

References

RFL Lancashire Cup
Lancashire Cup